Balahesar is a village in Samangan Province, in northern Afghanistan. It is located approximately 80 kilometres southwest of Samangan (Aybak).

See also
 Samangan Province

References

External links
Maplandia World Gazetteer

Populated places in Samangan Province